Verzenay is a commune in the Marne department in north-eastern France. The town is famed for its  vineyards and its champagne.

Champagne
The village's vineyards are located in the Montagne de Reims subregion of Champagne, and are classified as Grand Cru (100%) in the Champagne vineyard classification.

Verzenay is the location of Phare de Verzenay, a "Lighthouse" (Phare) which houses a Champagne museum.

See also
Communes of the Marne department
Classification of Champagne vineyards
Montagne de Reims Regional Natural Park

References

Communes of Marne (department)
Grand Cru Champagne villages